O'Leary Manager 2000 is a football player-manager game by British studio LiveMedia, released in 2000 for the Game Boy Color. The player can choose whether they want to focus on the management side of football, play the matches themselves on the game's 2D match engine, or combine the two features for a more in-depth experience.  It is endorsed by Irish football manager David O'Leary, who was managing English Premier League side Leeds United at the time of the game's release. The game was released as Guy Roux Manager 2000 in France, DSF Fußball Manager in Germany, Co Adriaanse Football Manager in the Netherlands and Barça Manager 2000 in Spain.

Gameplay

Management
The management side of O'Leary Manager 2000 is very comprehensive when compared to similar Game Boy Color games. The player can choose from 240 fully licensed teams from the top two leagues in England, France, Italy, Spain, Germany and the Netherlands to play as or manage, with each team having 16 players in their squad. There is also the option to promote a number of fictional youth team players. However, most of the youth team players are of low ability, so could only realistically be used for back-up when managing a decent quality team.

As with any football management game, the transfer market can often play a key role in whether the team achieves success. The player's selected team starts with either 10.5m or 5.5m to spend, depending on whether they were in the first or second tier of their country's football hierarchy. The player can also recoup some money by selling players to other teams. This is done by first offering the footballer for sale at a chosen price, from which interested clubs would then place offers that the player could choose to accept or not. Once a price is agreed, the footballer transfers clubs instantly. The values of footballers alternate greatly during the game, with the then Real Betis striker Denílson being the most expensive player at the start of the game. An unfortunate bug in the game allows the player to gain a huge sum of money (around 70m) if the club goes into a certain amount of debt, which pretty much negates the need for financial planning.

The club's board of directors constantly give assessments as to how they think the club is progressing under your management. This involves a short statement visible at the menu screen.  Other features available the menu screen include options to change you team line-up, formation and tactics; all vital when creating a successful team.

Similarly, you can decide what methods of training your team will undertake for the coming week. You have the option to "do training", which generally increase the statistics of your players (but at the risk of injuring them) or to concentrate on fitness training (which helps players stay fit and injured players to recover quicker). Alternatively, you may choose to skip training entirely for the week. You also have the option to view various statistics, such as league tables from around the world, top goalscorers and to view the squads of all available teams on the game.

Playing

The playing side of the game is similar in style to Sensible Soccer and Kick Off; offering a 2D, top-down perspective on the match. It has been praised for this style, as it values successful gameplay more than impressive graphics.

It is relatively simple to play, with the D-pad used for moving your selected player, and the "A" and "B" buttons used to shoot and pass respectively. Holding the button down will increase shot power, but will decrease accuracy. You can also apply curl to the ball by pressing left or right on the D-pad after the ball is hit. Pressing the "start" button will allow you to view a short replay of the previous action, which you can toggle between slow motion and real-time match speed by pressing the "select" button. Pressing the "select" button in open play will pause the game and display the menu, allowing you to change your tactics (formation, playing style etc.), make substitutions or to exit the match entirely and return to the default menu screen.

Competitions
In both player and manager roles, your chosen teams will participate in a number of competitions. This includes your domestic league (e.g. La Liga), where around 20-24 teams will compete through the year to gain the highest points total possible; therefore gaining the highest league position. Domestic cup competitions feature heavily as well, with teams from both leagues of your selected country competing in a knock-out competition. If your team achieves a high league position, they will enter European competitions. The top teams will enter the UEFA Champions League with a select number of teams below them entering the UEFA Cup.

Although the cup competitions in O'Leary Manager 2000 are not officially licensed (i.e. "Domestic Cup" instead of "FA Cup and "Euro Cup" instead of "UEFA Champions League"), they follow the same rules and structure of the competitions they represent.

Multiplayer
Despite being primarily a single-player game, O'Leary Manager 2000 allows the player to compete in a one-off match against another person, either as a player, a manager or both. This is done by connected both Game Boys together using a Game Link cable, as long as both users have the games cartridge installed.

Reception

In a 2014 retrospective review, Mikey Traynor of Balls.ie called O'Leary Manager 2000 "a great game, and one that should be played by far more people."

References

External links

Association football management video games
Game Boy Color games
2000 video games
Game Boy Color-only games
Video games developed in the United Kingdom
Cultural depictions of Irish men
Cultural depictions of association football players
Video games based on real people